Eberlin, or Eberlein, is a German surname.

Eberlin 
 Daniel Eberlin (1647–c.1714), German composer and violinist
 Johann Eberlin von Günzburg (c.1470–1533), German theologian
 Johann Ernst Eberlin (1702–1762), German composer and organist
 Livia S. Eberlin, Brazilian chemist, daughter of Marcos
 Marcos Nogueira Eberlin (1959–), Brazilian chemist and advocate of intelligent design, father of Livia

Eberlein
 Gerald L. Eberlein, German sociology educator
 Hugo Eberlein, German Communist politician
 Sophia Eberlein (1889–1931), Russian-American woman whose spirit is said to haunt the Harvey Library
 Johann Konrad Eberlein,  Austrian art historian
 William Frederick Eberlein, mathematician

See also
 Eberle (disambiguation)